A tripoint, trijunction, triple point, or tri-border area is a geographical point at which the boundaries of three countries or subnational entities meet.  There are 175 international tripoints as of 2020. Nearly half are situated in rivers, lakes or seas. On dry land, the exact tripoints may be indicated by markers or pillars, and occasionally by larger monuments.

Usually, the more neighbours a country has, the more international tripoints that country has. China with 16 international tripoints and Russia with 11 to 14 lead the list of states by number of international tripoints. Other countries, like Brazil, India and Algeria, have several international tripoints. Argentina has four international tripoints. South Africa, Pakistan and Nigeria have three international tripoints while Bangladesh and Mexico have only one. Within Europe, landlocked Austria has nine tripoints, among them two with Switzerland and Liechtenstein. Island countries, such as Japan and Australia, have no international tripoints (some, like Bahrain and Singapore, have tripoints in the territorial waters), and the same goes for countries with their only neighbour country, such as Portugal or Lesotho. Landlocked countries also have international tripoints. Likewise, the United States with two neighbouring countries has no international tripoints; however, it has a number of tristate points as well as one point where four states meet. Indonesia has no international tripoints, just like Australia, Japan and the United States. Canada, as well, with its only neighboring country has no international tripoints; however, it has five tripoints on land where the boundaries of provinces and territories meet, and one quadripoint where four provinces and territories meet. Japan has multiple prefectural tripoints; it also has prefectural quadripoints. In addition to the United States, Canada and Indonesia, Australia also has tripoints where the boundaries of states meet.

Border junctions (or "multiple points" or "multipoints" as they are also sometimes called) are most commonly threefold. There are also a number of quadripoints, and a handful of fivefold points, as well as probably unique examples of sixfold, sevenfold, and eightfold points (see ). The territorial claims of six countries converge at the south pole in a point of elevenfold complexity, though this is an example of points subject to dispute.

Examples

International tripoints include:
 the Treriksröset of Finland, Norway, and Sweden (the northernmost international tripoint in the world; the exact point is in a lake, but a marker is built on that point)
 the Vaalserberg of the Netherlands, Germany, and Belgium
 the "Dreiländereck" of Germany, France, and Switzerland (the exact point is in the river and the marker is not on the exact point)
 the Schengen tripoint of Germany, France, and Luxembourg (where the Schengen Agreement was signed on board a boat, since the tripoint is in the river)
 the summit of Sia Kangri (near Indira Col) is the tripoint where territories administered by India, Pakistan, and China meet.
 the Triple Frontier of Argentina, Brazil, and Paraguay
 the Tres Fronteras of Brazil, Peru, and Colombia
 the Trójstyk of Poland, Czech Republic and Slovakia
Mount Roraima, where Venezuela, Brazil, and Guyana all meet
Jongsong Peak, the eastern tripoint of China, India and Nepal
 Bratislava is the only capital city in the world which is located at a tripoint: Slovakia, Hungary, and Austria. The city's administrative area extends to the tripoint, but the point lies outside of urban Bratislava itself.
Some historic tripoints:
 the historic Three Emperors' Corner of Austria-Hungary, the Russian Empire, and German Empire
 the historic Piz da las Trais Linguas (Ortler Alps) of Austria-Hungary, the Kingdom of Italy, and Switzerland
 the historic Rock of the Three Kingdoms between the former kingdoms of Galicia, León, and Portugal (now part of the border between Kingdom of Spain and the Portuguese Republic).
 the Tossal dels Tres Reis ('Peak of the Three Kings'), located where the borders of the ancient Kingdoms of Aragon, Valencia and Principality of Catalonia meet.

International agreements
While the exact line of an international border is normally fixed by a bilateral treaty, the position of the tripoints may need to be settled by a trilateral agreement. For example, China, Russia, and Mongolia have set the position of the two relevant tripoints (the junction points of the China–Russia border, the Mongolia–Russia border, and the China–Mongolia border)   by the trilateral agreement signed in Ulaanbaatar on January 27, 1994. The agreement specified that a marker was to be erected at the eastern tripoint, called Tarbagan-Dakh, but that no marker would be erected at the western tripoint (which was defined as the peak of the mountain Tavan-Bogdo-Ula (Kuitunshan, Tavan Bogd Uul).

Gallery

See also
 List of tripoints
 List of tripoints of English counties
 Tri-state area
 Quadripoint
 Maritime boundary

References

External links

 Penedo dos Três Reinos («The Rock of Three Kingdoms»)
 Tripoint border of China, Russia and North Korea
 Tripoint border marker of Russia, China and North Korea at 9:28

Border-related lists